Jason Cripps (born 14 October 1976) is a former Australian rules footballer who played with St Kilda in the Australian Football League (AFL).

AFL career

Cripps was often used as a tagger but also played in defence. He played in the Saints' losing 1997 Grand Final team and in 1998 suffered a serious hamstring injury which saw the muscle torn off the bone. As a result, he did not return to football until 2001, kicking a goal with his first kick back. He was delisted at the conclusion of the 2002 season.

Post football career
Cripps played with Tasmania in the VFL for a season before returning to St Kilda in player development and assistant coaching roles under Grant Thomas.

He moved to Port Adelaide for the 2007 season as an assistant coach under Mark Williams before becoming the club's list manager at the end of 2011.

In 2015 he suffered a heart attack whilst out jogging in Perth. He was in Perth with the other Power's recruiting staff to watch the NAB AFL Under-18 Championships.

References

Holmesby, Russell and Main, Jim (2007). The Encyclopedia of AFL Footballers. 7th ed. Melbourne: Bas Publishing.

External links

1976 births
Living people
Australian rules footballers from Victoria (Australia)
St Kilda Football Club players
Sandringham Dragons players
De La Salle OC Amateur Football Club players
Tasmanian Devils Football Club players
People educated at Marcellin College, Bulleen